Myriad Group AG is a Swiss software company in the mobile communications sector. Myriad delivers consumer applications, social media and messaging solutions, and embedded software to OEM's, mobile operators and pay TV providers. Myriad operates through three product divisions  Versy, Myriad Connect and Device Solutions.

History
The company was established in 2009 by the merger of Purple Labs and Esmertec. As part of the new company structure, Myriad began offering products and services for Mobile Operators, including USSD self-service capabilities and graphical user interfaces (GUIs) on Java-enabled devices.

Stephen Dunford was appointed as Myriad's  Chief Executive Officer on 4 December 2012. He stepped down in January 2017. The current CEO, Philipp Bolliger was appointed in June 2018.

Purple Labs 
The company was founded in 2001 by Jean-Luc Botto, Dennis O'Donovan, Sebastien Soyer and Jean-Marie Andre. Purple Labs was French, headquartered in Chambéry, and developed and marketed Linux-based software to mobile OEMs and ODMs.

Simon Wilkinson was appointed as chief executive officer in October 2007, shortly after the firm raised $14.5 million in venture capital funding. On June 30, 2008, Purple Labs acquired Openwave's mobile phone client software division, which develops browser and messaging client technologies, for $32 million. On July 31, 2008 the company agreed to acquire Sagem Communication's mobile phone software and associated engineering teams. On 16 April 2012 the company expanded further with the acquisition of Synchronica plc.

In September 2012, James Bodha, Mike Grant and Gary Bunney were appointed as co-CEOs until a new full-time CEO had been found.

References

External links

 http://www.myriadgroup.com/

Linux companies
Mobile web browsers
Software companies of France
Software companies of Switzerland